Achmed Adolf Wolfgang Khammas (born March 23, 1952) is a German author, translator and interpreter. He is most popular for being one of the very few authors to write about Islam and science fiction in the Arabic language. Khammas is also active in the field of sustainable energy.

Early life 
Khammas was born in Berlin in 1952 to a German mother and Iraqi father. He grew up in Damascus, Syria. After attending school there he returned to Berlin to work at the Berlin Institute of Technology. Shortly later he moved back to Damascus where he built up a factory for the production of solar thermal plants, between the years of 1977 and 1989. Since, he is back in Berlin and working as a translator and interpreter.

Bibliography 
 Der Wettbewerb ("The competition")
 2007 - Buch der Synergie ("Book of synergy")

References

External links 
 
 'Book of synergy' of Achmed Khammas

1952 births
Living people
Writers from Berlin
Iraqi writers
German people of Iraqi descent
Iraqi translators
German–Arabic translators
German male writers